Tushan Station is a station on Loop line of Chongqing Rail Transit in Chongqing municipality, China. It is located in Nan'an District and opened in 2018.

There are two island platforms at this station, but only two inner ones are currently in use and the other two outer ones are reserved.

References

Railway stations in Chongqing
Railway stations in China opened in 2018
Chongqing Rail Transit stations